Green Book is a 2018 American comedy-drama film about a tour of the Deep South in the 1960s by African American classical and jazz pianist Don Shirley (Mahershala Ali) and Tony Vallelonga (Viggo Mortensen), an Italian American bouncer who served as Shirley's driver and bodyguard. Directed by Peter Farrelly, the screenplay was written by Farrelly, Brian Hayes Currie and Vallelonga's son Nick Vallelonga, based on interviews with his father and Shirley, as well as letters his father wrote to his mother.

Green Book had its world premiere at the Toronto International Film Festival in September 2018, where it won the People's Choice Award. It was theatrically released in the United States on November 16, 2018, by Universal Pictures. The film received positive reviews from critics, with Mortensen and Ali's performances being lauded, and was chosen by the National Board of Review as the best film of 2018, as well as one of the Top 10 films of 2018 by the American Film Institute. The film has received numerous awards and nominations, including Best Motion Picture – Musical or Comedy at the 76th Golden Globe Awards and Academy Award for Best Picture at the 91st Academy Awards.

Accolades

Notes

See also
 2018 in film

References

External links 
 

Lists of accolades by film